The FA Cup semi-finals are played to determine which teams will contest the FA Cup Final. They are the penultimate phase of the FA Cup, the oldest football tournament in the world.

Location 

The semi-finals have always been contested at neutral venues. Since 2008, all semi-finals have been held at the new Wembley. In the past any suitably large ground which was not the home ground of a team in that semi-final was used. Villa Park in Birmingham, Old Trafford in Manchester, and Hillsborough in Sheffield were common hosts. All semi-finals between 1871 and 1881 were played at Kennington Oval. The first neutral semi-final match outside London took place in 1882 in Huddersfield.

The 1989 semi-final between Liverpool and Nottingham Forest at Hillsborough, Sheffield, turned into tragedy when 96 supporters were killed in the stands due to overcrowding. The Hillsborough disaster had wide-ranging effects on future stadium design. Liverpool were granted a special dispensation to avoid playing their 2012 semi-final match against Everton on the 23rd anniversary of the disaster.

The 1991 North London derby semi-final between Arsenal and Tottenham Hotspur was the first to be played at Wembley, the traditional venue for the FA Cup Final. Two years later both semi-finals were held at Wembley after the first FA Cup Steel City derby–between Sheffield clubs Wednesday and United–was switched from the original venue of Elland Road, Leeds, after fans of both Sheffield sides protested.

This was repeated in 1994, although a replay between Manchester United and Oldham Athletic was held at Maine Road, Manchester. From 1995 to 1999 and from 2001 to 2004 other neutral grounds were used, though in 2000 both matches were played at the old Wembley, in its final year of operation. In 2005 both semi-finals were played at the Millennium Stadium, Cardiff. However, in 2006 the FA decided to revert to the neutral ground system, with Villa Park and Old Trafford hosting the games.

In 2003, it was announced that all future semi-finals would be played at the new Wembley Stadium, once it had opened; this took effect in 2008. The decision was mainly for financial reasons, to allow the FA to recoup some of the costs of rebuilding the stadium. However, the move was opposed by traditionalists and drew criticism from some supporters' groups. Over a decade after the move, Aston Villa (amongst others) have called for the semi-finals to be regionalised once again.

Tottenham Hotspur's 2018 semi-final was to some extent a home match for them, as they played their home games at Wembley that season while their new stadium was under construction. However, for the semi-final, it was treated as a neutral venue.

Format 

In the past, there would be a replay if a semi-final match was drawn. If the replay was also drawn, there would be a second replay. In theory, an unlimited number of games could be played to obtain a winner. For example, in 1980 it took four games to decide the tie between Arsenal and Liverpool. This was the most games needed to settle an FA Cup semi-final, although there were several occasions when three games were played. Prior to the 1992 semi-finals, the only semi-final played under different rules to this was the rearranged 1989 semi-final between Liverpool and Nottingham Forest, for which it had been declared in advance that the game would be decided by extra time and penalties if necessary due to the Hillsborough Stadium disaster.

Queen's Park chose not to contest the 1871–72 replay match with Wanderers.

There were no semi-finals played in the 1872–73 competition. Under the rules at the time, holders Wanderers received a bye to the final. Queen's Park again decided not to contest a semi-final, so Oxford University advanced automatically.

Between 1877 and 1881 only one semi-final was played due to the format of the competition leaving three teams remaining.

In 1991 the FA decided that only one replay should be played (starting with the 1991–92 competition). If this game ended in a draw, extra time would be played, followed by penalty kicks if the match was still even. In 1999 it was decided that the semi-finals should be decided in one game, with extra time and penalties if the score was level after 90 minutes. Replays are still used in earlier rounds, however, though they were eliminated in the quarter-finals in 2016. The last FA Cup semi-final replay, in 1999, saw Manchester United take on Arsenal at Villa Park. This turned out to become one of the most memorable semi-finals of all time, with Peter Schmeichel saving a last-minute penalty from Dennis Bergkamp and a Ryan Giggs extra time goal deciding the outcome in Manchester United's favour. In 2003 this goal was voted the greatest ever in FA Cup history.

From 2016 to 2017, a fourth substitute was allowed in semi-final matches if the game went into extra time.

Records 

Villa Park is the most used stadium in FA Cup semi–final history, having hosted 55 semi–finals.

The highest attendance for an FA Cup semi-final is 88,141 for Everton's penalty win over Manchester United on 19 April 2009. It was the fourth semi-final to be played at the new Wembley Stadium.

The highest winning margin was Newcastle United's 6–0 victory over Fulham in the 1908 Anfield semi-final.
The highest post-war winning margin was Stoke City's 5–0 victory over Bolton Wanderers in the second 2011 semi-final on 17 April 2011.
The highest-scoring match was Hull City's 5–3 victory over Sheffield United in the second 2014 semi-final.

List of FA Cup semi-finals

Key

Results
1870s°1880s°1890s°1900s°1910s°1920s°1930s°1940s°1950s°1960s°1970s°1980s°1990s°2000s°2010s

Semi-finals table 

Teams shown with an asterisk beside their name are no longer in existence. This table is updated as of the 2021–22 FA Cup.

Venues

Venues that no longer exist or regularly host football matches are denoted with an asterisk.

Third-fourth place matches
The FA Cup Third-fourth place matches were played to determine the order of third and fourth place in the FA Cup. They were introduced in 1970 replacing the traditional pre-final match between England and Young England. The third-fourth place matches were generally unpopular, with only the first one in 1970 getting some positive attention as an occasion, and they were abandoned after five seasons. The 1972 and 1973 third-fourth place matches were played at the start of the following season, and the 1974 third-fourth place match was played five days after the final. The 1972 third-fourt place match was the first FA Cup match to be decided on penalties. The five third-fourth place FA Cup matches were:

See also
FA Cup
FA Cup Final
Hillsborough Disaster

Notes

References

General
FA Cup statistics

Specific

External links
 Match details, programme images, etc at footballsite.co.uk

Semi-finals